The West Sussex County Council election, 2013 took place on 2 May 2013, as part of the 2013 United Kingdom local elections. All 71 electoral divisions were up for election, which returned one county councillor each by first-past-the-post voting for a four-year term of office. At this election, the Conservative Party was seeking to retain overall control of the council, and the Liberal Democrats to maintain their position as the main opposition party.

All locally registered electors (British, Irish, Commonwealth and European Union citizens) who were aged 18 or over on Thursday 2 May 2013 were entitled to vote in the local elections. Those who were temporarily away from their ordinary address (for example, away working, on holiday, in student accommodation or in hospital) were also entitled to vote in the local elections, although those who had moved abroad and registered as overseas electors cannot vote in the local elections. It is possible to register to vote at more than one address (such as a university student who had a term-time address and lives at home during holidays) at the discretion of the local Electoral Register Office, but it remains an offence to vote more than once in the same local government election.

Summary
The Conservative Party, who have controlled control of the council since 1997, retained control with a majority of 10 seats, a loss of three seats compared to the 2009 result. The Conservative Party also retained Imberdown which had been gained due to a defection from the Liberal Democrats.

The United Kingdom Independence Party (UKIP) won 10 seats to become the official opposition on the council, a net gain of 8 seats. In the intervening period since the last election UKIP gained two seats by defection from the Conservatives, Kingston Buci and Worthing West, UKIP failed to retain either seat. The Liberal Democrats lost 11 seats and gained 1 seat, leaving them with a total of 8 seats. Labour gained 4 seats from the Conservatives, but lost Haywards Heath Town to the Conservative, which Labour had gained by defection from the Liberal Democrats. Labour won a total of 6 seats, all in the Borough of Crawley.

Of the parties that did not gain any representation on the council. only the Green Party contested more than one electoral division. The Green Party lost its only county councillor, who had defected from the Liberal Democrats.

An independent gained Midhurst division from the Conservatives. The Conservative candidate for the Division of Midhurst was forced to resign from the Conservative Party, but did so after the close of nomination and date to withdraw nominations, meaning their name remained on the ballot paper. This was due to comments made regarding the potential admissions policy of a proposed new boarding school in West Sussex.

Election Results Summary

|}

Results by electoral division
West Sussex is composed of 7 districts: Adur District, Arun District, Chichester District, Crawley Borough, Horsham District, Mid Sussex District and Worthing Borough.  The following results are grouped by district.

Adur

Arun

Chichester

Crawley

Horsham

Mid Sussex

Worthing

References

External links
West Sussex County Council

2013 English local elections
2013
2010s in West Sussex